Johnny Steals Europe is a 1932 German comedy crime film directed by Harry Piel and Andrew Marton and starring Piel, Dary Holm and Alfred Abel. The film was based on a novel by Werner Scheff. It was shot at the Staaken Studios in Berlin and on location on the French Riviera. Released by the German branch of Universal Pictures, it premiered on 15 June 1932.

Synopsis
A German helps a group of Americans to recover Europa, their stolen horse.

Cast
 Harry Piel as Jonny Buck
 Dary Holm as Ursel Matting
 Alfred Abel as Jack Matting
 Margarete Sachse as Miss Pepson
 Walter Steinbeck as Max Dievenak
 Hermann Blaß as Siegfried Hagelberg
 Carl Balhaus as Monk
 Charly Berger as Frontz
 Kurt Lilien as Laberkow
 Wolfgang von Schwindt as Rueckers
 Gerhard Dammann as Wilke
 Hans Wallner as Altkleiderhaendler
 Fritz Spira as Labinger
 Bruno Ziener as Rittmeister

References

Bibliography

External links

1932 films
Films of the Weimar Republic
1930s crime comedy films
German crime comedy films
1930s German-language films
Films directed by Harry Piel
Films directed by Andrew Marton
Films based on German novels
German horse racing films
German black-and-white films
Universal Pictures films
1932 comedy films
Films shot at Staaken Studios
Films shot in France
1930s German films